The 1999 edition of the Campeonato Carioca kicked off on January 31, 1999 and ended on June 19, 1999. It is the official tournament organized by FFERJ (Federação de Futebol do Estado do Rio de Janeiro, or Rio de Janeiro State Football Federation. Only clubs based in the Rio de Janeiro State are allowed to play. Thirteen teams contested this edition. Flamengo won the title for the 25th time. no teams were relegated.

System
The tournament was divided in four stages:
 Preliminary tournament: The four bottom teams in the 1998 Preliminary tournament joined Cabo Frio, champions of the 1998 Second Level. The five teams all played against each other in a double round-robin format, but for classification purposes, they were divided into two groups; one with the teams from the city of Rio de Janeiro, and the other with the hinterland teams; The best team in each group qualified into the main tournament.
 Taça Guanabara: The 10 clubs all played in single round-robin format against each other.
 Taça Rio: The 10 clubs all played in single round-robin format against each other. 
 Finals:  The Finals would happen in two matches, both played at the Maracanã Stadium, between the champions of the Taças Guanabara and Rio.

Championship

Preliminary phase

Interior Group

Capital Group

Taça Guanabara

Taça Rio

Finals

References

Campeonato Carioca seasons
Carioca